Physcidia is a genus of lichen-forming fungi in the family Ramalinaceae. The genus was circumscribed in 1862 by American lichenologist Edward Tuckerman.

Species
 Physcidia australasica 
 Physcidia callopis 
 Physcidia carassensis 
 Physcidia endococcinea 
 Physcidia matogrossensis 
 Physcidia neotropica 
 Physcidia squamulosa 
 Physcidia striata 
 Physcidia wrightii 

The taxon once known as Physcidia cylindrophora  is now Bacidia cylindrophora.

References

Ramalinaceae
Lichen genera
Lecanorales genera
Taxa described in 1862
Taxa named by Edward Tuckerman